The Peabody Bookshop and Beer Stube was a fixture in the Mount Vernon section of Baltimore, Maryland for over 50 years.

There was a crowded, dusty bookshop in front, and a crowded room in the back where customers could get beer and a sandwich.  There was a piano on one wall, mounted animal heads, wooden tables carved with the names of patrons.  At 10:00 PM, Dantini the Magnificent would do his 15-minute magic show.

The bookshop also served as an art gallery for local artists.

Location 
Located at 913 N. Charles Street, the Peabody was within walking distance of the Walters Art Gallery, the George Peabody Library, the Joseph Meyerhoff Symphony Hall, Baltimore's Washington Monument, and the Brexton Hotel.

Weisberger years 
Brothers Hugo and Siegfried Weisberger, Austrian immigrants, started the bookshop in 1922, during Prohibition.  Siegfried became sole owner in 1931, when Hugo died.

This was an early example of a bookshop with its own beer bar, and possibly the very first such in the US.

Weisberger abandoned the Peabody in 1954, convinced by long time patron H. L. Mencken, that the "Age of the Boob" had arrived, and people were no longer interested in "books and ideals and culture. They only want dollars."

When Siegfried walked away from "100,000 volumes nobody wants to read", the news was covered across the nation, from Detroit to Phoenix, Arizona; Wilmington, Delaware to Santa Cruz, California.

Interregnum 
The Peabody didn't stay closed.  It reopened under the ownership of Paul P. Adler and Irving
Mindess, later in 1954, and remained popular with students from the University of Maryland

Rose Hayes years 
The oft-married Rose Boyajian Smith Pettus Hayes took ownership of the shop in 1957 and ran it until she died in 1986.

Rose added a second bar upstairs, and was active in preserving other Baltimore properties, including revitalizing the Brexton Hotel
In the 70's the Peabody hosted Saturday film festivals.

In 1979, the Peabody suffered the loss of two long-time performers: singer–violinist Max Rathje who knew every regular's favorite song, and Vincent Cierkes, popularly known as “Dantini the Magnificent."

The shop closed not long after Rose's death.

End 
The building at 913 North Charles Street was demolished in 1997, to make way for a parking lot.

Patrons of note 
 H. L. Mencken
 Gerald Johnson
 Patrick Skene Catling

In fiction 
Natalie Standiford based Carmichael's Bookshop, in "How to Say Goodbye in Robot" on the Peabody Bookshop.

References

External links 
Postcard showing inside the beer stube
Photo of street front
Application Form for the National Register of Historic Places (Rose B. Pettus)

Buildings and structures in Baltimore
Culture of Baltimore
History of Baltimore
Bookstores in Maryland
Demolished buildings and structures in Maryland
Buildings and structures demolished in 1997
1922 establishments in Maryland
1970s disestablishments in Maryland